Marius Gabriel (born 13 November 1954 in Mafikeng, South Africa) is a historical novelist. He is the author of The Redcliffe Sisters series, The Designer, The Ocean Liner, The Parisians and a number of other bestsellers.
He has homes in Cairo and Lincolnshire. In 2018, he and Kerry Wilkinson became the first men using their own names to win a RoNA Award in the organisation's 58-year history. Gabriel won for his historical novel, The Designer.

Biography
Marius Gabriel Cipolla studied Shakespeare in the University of Newcastle in northern England. To finance his postgraduate research, he began writing romance fiction. He sold his first novel to Mills & Boon,  published in 1983 under the female pseudonym Madeleine Ker. He left his academic pursuits to become a full-time writer.

Bibliography

As Marius Gabriel

Suspense novels

The Mask of Time (1994)
House of Many Rooms (1999)

Historical novels

The Original Sin (1993)
The Seventh Moon (2001)
The Chronicle Of Marcellus (2009)
Gabon (2011)
Wish Me Luck as You Wave Me Goodbye (2015)
Take Me to Your Heart Again (2016)
The Designer (2017)
The Ocean Liner (2018)
The Parisians (2019)
The Girls in the Attic (2021)

As Madeleine Ker

Single novels
Aquamarine (1983)
Virtuous lady (1983)
Voyage of the Mistral (1983)
Pacific Aphrodite (1983)
The Street of the Fountain (1984)
Winged Lion (1984)
Pacific Aphrodite (1984)
Working Relationship (1984)
Fire of the Gods (1984)
Out of This Darkness (1984)
Hostage (1985)
Comrade Wolf (1985)
Ice Princess (1985)
Danger Zone (1985)
Impact (1986)
The Wilder Shores of Love (1987)
Judgement (1987)
Frazer's Law (1987)
Stormy Attraction (1988)
Take-over (1988)
Tuscan Encounter (1988)
Troublemaker (1988)
Special Arrangement (1989)
Tiger's Eye (1989)
Passion's Far Shore (1989)
Duel of Passion (1990)
Whirlpool (1992)
The Alpha Male (2003)
The Sicilian Duke's Demand (2005)

Postcards from Europe Series (Multi-Author)
The Bruges Engagement (1992)

Mistress to a Millionaire Series (Multi-Author)
The Millionaire Boss's Mistress (2004)

Omnibus in collaboration
Trodden Paths / Voyage of the Mistral / Innocent Abroad (1989) (with Jacqueline Gilbert and Jessica Steele)

Graphic Novels
Never Kiss A Stranger (2006)

Omnibus in collaboration
Anvil of Stars / The Original Sin / The Shee (1993) (with Joe Donnelly and Greg Bear)

Children's
Smartypig (2002)

References and sources

Marius Gabriel on Fantastic Fiction
Madeleine Ker on Fantastic Fiction
The story of Smartypig

External links
Marius Gabriel's reviews at Amazon.com

1954 births
20th-century American novelists
21st-century American novelists
American male novelists
South African male novelists
Living people
20th-century American male writers
21st-century American male writers